The 1988 Purdue Boilermakers football team represented Purdue University as a member of the Big Ten Conference during the 1988 NCAA Division I-A football season. Led by second-year head coach Fred Akers, the Boilermakers compiled an overall record of 4–7 with a mark of 3–5 in conference play, placing sixth in the Big Ten. Purdue played home games at Ross–Ade Stadium in West Lafayette, Indiana.

Schedule

Personnel

Game summaries

Washington

Ohio

at Notre Dame

Minnesota

at Illinois

at Ohio State

First road win for Fred Akers at Purdue
First win at Columbus since 1967

Iowa

at Wisconsin

Michigan State

at Northwestern

Indiana

Awards
Brian Fox – Big Ten All-Freshman Team

References

Purdue
Purdue Boilermakers football seasons
Purdue Boilermakers football